Stanislav Holý (25 January 1943 – 14 August 1998) was a Czech graphic artist, caricaturist, and a designer of animated films.

He studied at the Applied Arts Academy in Prague. He is known as an author and illustrator of a series of children's books. As a cartoonist, he is known as the creator of the cartoon character Mr. Pip.

Books authored
 1969 – Algebrion
 1978 – Procházky pana Pipa  (Mr. Pip's Trips 1) . Praha: Albatros.
 1982 – Námluvy pana Pipa. Praha: Albatros.
 1988 – Jů, Hele, neděle! Praha: Panorama.
 1989 – Svět je báječné místo k narození : kniha kresleného humoru. Praha: ČTK Repro.
 2000 – Jů, Hele, pondělí. Praha: Pan Pip Studio Publishing.
 2011 – Procházky pana Pipa  2 (Mr. Pip's Trips'' 2), rozš. vyd. Benešov: ELTSEN.

References

External links
Pan Pip' s website

1943 births
1998 deaths
Artists from Prague
Czech illustrators
Czech animators
Czech caricaturists
Czech graphic designers
Czech cartoonists